Title 49 of the United States Code is a positive law title of the United States Code with the heading "Transportation." 

During the time between when the Title 49 positive law codification began in 1978 and when it was completed in 1994, the remaining non-positive law sections were placed in an appendix to Title 49. 

In 1995, the ICC Termination Act, substantively and significantly amended Title 49. 

In 2010, Congress enacted Title 51 as a new positive law title concerning NASA and commercial space programs.  As part of the codification, the heading of Subtitle IX was marked "transferred" and the contents of such subtitle were moved to Title 51. Five years later, the FAST Act inserted a new Subtitle IX.  The heading of new Subtitle IX was given the heading "Multimodal Freight Transportation." 

 Subtitle I—Department of Transportation
 Subtitle II—Other Government Agencies
 Subtitle III—General and Intermodal Programs
 Subtitle IV—Interstate Transportation
 Subtitle V—Rail Programs
 Subtitle VI—Motor Vehicle and Driver Programs
 Subtitle VII—Aviation Programs
 Subtitle VIII—Pipelines
 Subtitle IX—Multimodal Freight Transportation
 Subtitle X—Miscellaneous

External links
U.S. Code Title 49, via United States Government Printing Office
U.S. Code Title 49, via Cornell University

References

49
Title 49